John Stewart was a Scottish soldier and Constable of Stirling Castle for James VI of Scotland.

He was known as "Master John Stewart", perhaps indicating a university education.

In 1576 he carried out improvements and repairs to Stirling castle, including a new timber gallery on the west side of the Palace, and repairs to the gatehouse. At this time, James VI was resident in the castle, in the care of Annabell Murray, Countess of Mar.

Stewart's account for the work at Stirling in 1576 survives in the National Archives of Scotland. Timber and slates were brought to Stirling by boat on the River Forth. A blacksmith, John Cowan, made an iron support for the new doorway from the gallery into the passage that leads to the rooms above the king's outer chamber. 

Stewart was ill in March 1581 and his duties were given to the gunner Michael Gardiner who became depute-keeper of Stirling Castle. When he recovered, the keeping of the castle was restored to him on 28 March, and on 4 April 1581, Stewart signed an inventory of the brass and iron cannon in the castle.

Family
John Stewart married Margaret Makstoun or Maxton.

They had a son, also John Stewart, who was a varlet or valet in the king's chamber from March 1573. John Stewart, the valet, died in 1593. The royal master of work William Schaw ordered a carpenter in the Canongate, and royal gunner, David Selkirk, to make his coffin. His widow Lucrece Fleming, a daughter of Lord Fleming, married Robert Graham of the Fauld, a borderer, who died in 1600. James VI wrote to the English border warden Lord Scrope for help for her to secure his legacy.

References

Scottish soldiers
Court of James VI and I
People of Stirling Castle